The Hood River County School District (HRCSD) is a public school district in Hood River County, Oregon, United States that serves the communities of Cascade Locks, Hood River, Odell, Pine Grove, and Parkdale.

District headquarters are at 1011 Eugene Street in Hood River. Rich Polkinghorn is the superintendent. Seven people serve on the school board.

Demographics
In the 2009 school year, the district had 24 students classified as homeless by the Oregon Department of Education, or 0.6 percent of students in the district.

Schools

High school
Hood River Valley High School, grades 9–12, Hood River

Middle school
Wy'east Middle School, grades 6–8, Odell 
Hood River Middle School, grades 6–8, Hood River
The Hood River Middle School building formerly served as Hood River High School and is listed on the National Register of Historic Places.

Elementary school
Cascade Locks Elementary School, grades K–5, Cascade Locks
May Street Elementary School, grades K–5, Hood River 
Mid Valley Elementary School, grades K–5, Odell 
Parkdale Elementary School, grades K–5, Parkdale 
Westside Elementary School, grades K–5, Hood River

Mixed grade
Hood River Options Academy, grades K–12, Hood River

See also
List of school districts in Oregon

References

Education in Hood River County, Oregon
School districts in Oregon